Bruce Wallrodt,  (26 September 1951 – 2 July 2019) was an Australian Paralympic athlete. He competed at five Paralympic Games and won nine medals, four of them gold.

Personal
Wallrodt was born on 26 September 1951 in the Western Australian city of Bunbury. He attended South Bunbury Primary School and Newton Moore Senior High School. After leaving school, he worked as a fitter and turner until the age of 29, when he had a spinal haemorrhage that left him paraplegic.

Career

In the 1988 Seoul Games, Wallrodt won two gold medals in the Men's Shot Put 2 and the Men's Javelin 2 events, and a bronze medal in the Men's Discus 2 event. At the 1990 World Championships and Games for the Disabled in Assen, Netherlands he won gold medals in the Men's Shot Put and Discus F4 events. At the 1992 Barcelona Games, he won a gold medal in the Men's Javelin THW4 event (for which he received a Medal of The Order of Australia), and two silver medals in the Men's Discus THW4 and the Men's Shot Put THW4 events. Going into the 1992 Games, he was a world record holder in discus, javelin and shot put. In the 1996 Atlanta Games, he won a gold medal in the Men's Shot Put F53 event, in which he broke a world record, and a bronze medal in the Men's Javelin F53 event. In 2000, he received an Australian Sports Medal. He won a silver medal at the 2000 Sydney Games in the men's shot put T54 event and came 4th in the Men's Javelin F54 – event. At the 2004 Athens Games, he came fifth in both the Men's Javelin F54 and the Men's Shot Put F54 events.

Wallrodt died on 2 July 2019 at the age of 67.

References

External links
Athletics Australia Results

1951 births
2019 deaths
Athletes (track and field) at the 1988 Summer Paralympics
Athletes (track and field) at the 1992 Summer Paralympics
Athletes (track and field) at the 1996 Summer Paralympics
Athletes (track and field) at the 2000 Summer Paralympics
Athletes (track and field) at the 2004 Summer Paralympics
Medalists at the 1988 Summer Paralympics
Medalists at the 1992 Summer Paralympics
Medalists at the 1996 Summer Paralympics
Medalists at the 2000 Summer Paralympics
Paralympic athletes of Australia
Paralympic gold medalists for Australia
Paralympic silver medalists for Australia
Paralympic bronze medalists for Australia
Paralympic medalists in athletics (track and field)
People from Bunbury, Western Australia
People with paraplegia
Recipients of the Australian Sports Medal
Recipients of the Medal of the Order of Australia
Track and field athletes from Western Australia
Wheelchair discus throwers
Wheelchair javelin throwers
Wheelchair shot putters
Paralympic discus throwers
Paralympic javelin throwers
Paralympic shot putters
Australian male discus throwers
Australian male javelin throwers
Australian male shot putters